St Dennis and Nanpean is an electoral division of Cornwall in the United Kingdom and returns one member to sit on Cornwall Council. The current councillor is Fred Greenslade, an Independent.

Extent
St Dennis and Nanpean covers the villages of Treviscoe, Nanpean, and St Dennis and the hamlets of Trelion, Trethosa, Stepaside, Goonamarris and Enniscaven. The hamlet of Treneague is shared with St Stephen-in-Brannel division. The division covers 2652 hectares in total.

Election results

2017 election

2013 election

References

Electoral divisions of Cornwall Council